Waitsfield is a census-designated place (CDP) in the town of Waitsfield, Washington County, Vermont, United States. The population of the CDP was 164 at the 2010 census.

Geography

References

Census-designated places in Vermont
Census-designated places in Washington County, Vermont